The 370th Fighter Squadron is an inactive United States Army Air Forces unit.  The squadron was activated in early 1943 and  assigned to the 359th Fighter Group.  After training in the United States, it deployed to England and participated in combat in the European Theater of Operations, earning a Distinguished Unit Citation for its action.  Following V-E Day, the squadron returned to at Camp Kilmer, New Jersey, where it was inactivated on 10 November 1945.

History
The 370th Fighter Squadron was activated in early 1943 as one of the original three squadrons of the 359th Fighter Group. The squadron trained in New England during 1943.

The squadron moved to England in October 1943, where it became part of VIII Fighter Command.  It entered combat in mid-December 1943, using the callsign "Wheeler" supported the invasion of Normandy during June 1944 by patrolling the English Channel, escorting bombardment formations to the French coast, and dive-bombing and strafing bridges, locomotives, and rail lines near the battle area.  After D-Day, engaged chiefly in escorting bombers to oil refineries, marshalling yards, and other targets in such cities as Ludwigshafen, Stuttgart, Frankfurt, Berlin, Merseburg, and Brux.   Continued combat operations until the German capitulation in May 1945.   The unit returned to the United States and was inactivated in November 1945.

Lineage
 Constituted as the 370th Fighter Squadron (Single Engine) on 20 December 1942
 Activated on 15 January 1943
 Inactivated on 10 November 1945

Assignments
 359th Fighter Group, 15 January 1943 – 10 November 1945

Stations
 Westover Field, Massachusetts, 15 January 1943
 Bedford Army Air Field, Massachusetts, 5 April 1943
 Mitchel Field, New York, 24 May 1943
 Westover Field, Massachusetts, 22 August 1943 – 2 October 1943
 RAF East Wretham (Station 133), England, ca. 18 October 1943 – ca. 4 November 1945
 Camp Kilmer, New Jersey, 9 November 1945 – 10 November 1945

Aircraft
 Republic P-47 Thunderbolt, 1943–1944
 North American P-51 Mustang, 1944–1945

Awards and Campaigns
 

Manual campaign table

References

Notes
 Explanatory notes

 Citations

Bibliography

 
 
 

Fighter squadrons of the United States Army Air Forces
Military units and formations established in 1942